The office of Master of the Household is one of the Great Offices of the Royal Household of Scotland. It was held by various Earls of Argyll from the reign of James IV onwards.  It was confirmed as a hereditary office to the 9th Earl by Crown charter of novodamus in 1667, and has remained with the Dukes of Argyll to the present day.

Sources
Stair Memorial Encyclopedia of the Laws of Scotland, Vol 7, para 822

References

Political office-holders in Scotland
Lists of Scottish people
Positions within the British Royal Household